Columbia Central High School can refer to
Columbia Central High School (Bloomsburg, Pennsylvania)
Columbia Central High School (Columbia, Tennessee)
Columbia Central High School (Brooklyn, Michigan)